Siaosi Leuo (born ) is a Samoan male weightlifter, competing in the 85 kg category and representing Samoa at international competitions. He participated at the 2014 Commonwealth Games in the 85 kg event. He won the silver medal at the 2015 Pacific Games, lifting a total of 343 kg. At the 2016 Oceania Weightlifting Championships he won the gold medal, lifting a total of 336 kg.

Major competitions

References

External links

1992 births
Living people
Samoan male weightlifters
Place of birth missing (living people)
Weightlifters at the 2014 Commonwealth Games
Commonwealth Games competitors for Samoa